Petrea Barker (born 18 September 1975) is a Paralympic swimming competitor from Australia.  She won a bronze medal at the 1996 Atlanta Games in the Women's 100 m Freestyle MH event. She was born on 18 September 1975. She was an Australian Institute of Sport scholarship holder from 1998 to 1999.

References

Female Paralympic swimmers of Australia
Swimmers at the 1996 Summer Paralympics
Paralympic bronze medalists for Australia
1975 births
Living people
Medalists at the 1996 Summer Paralympics
Paralympic medalists in swimming
Australian female freestyle swimmers
Australian female butterfly swimmers
Australian female backstroke swimmers
S14-classified Paralympic swimmers